The Monument to Party Founding is a monument in Pyongyang, the capital of North Korea.

The monument is rich in symbolism: its hammer, sickle and calligraphy brush symbolize the workers, farmers and intellectuals. It is 50 meters high to symbolize the 50-year anniversary of the founding of the Workers' Party of Korea. The number of slabs comprising the belt around the monument and its diameter stand for the date of birth of Kim Jong-il. The inscription on the outer belt says "Long live the leader and organizer of the victories of the people of Korea, the Workers' Party of Korea!" On the inside of the belt are three bronze reliefs with their distinct meanings: the historical root of the party, the unity of people under the party and the party's vision for a progressive future. Two red flag-shaped buildings with letters forming the words "ever-victorious" surround the monument.

History
The monument, designed by Mansudae Art Studio, was completed on 10 October 1995, on the 50th anniversary of the foundation of the Workers' Party of Korea. A previous monument dedicated to the foundation had been erected on 10 October 1975 on the grounds of the Party Founding Museum.

The Monument to Party Founding appeared on postage stamps in 1995 and 2005 and is featured on the 50 won banknote.

Features

The monument is situated on Munsu Street in the Taedonggang District of Pyongyang, on the bank of the Taedong River. On the opposite side of the river is the Mansu Hill Grand Monument, and the Korean Revolutionary Museum, both of which the Monument to Party Founding is symmetrically aligned with. This axis across the center of Pyongyang symbolizes the dynasty of Kim Il-sung and Kim Jong-il.

The monument site in its entirety spans 25,000 square meters. This includes a plaza in front of the monument where dances and festivities are held. The lawn of the park surrounding the monument is 15,000 square meters in extent. There are 12 fountain basins. The grounds are spotted with more than 53,000 trees.

There are symmetrical, waving flag-shaped, red residential buildings on either side of the monument. The letters on top of the buildings read: "ever-victorious".

The monument itself is made of granite and the reliefs are bronze.

Three highest element of the monument features three clenched fists holding a hammer, sickle and a calligraphy brush. The hammer and sickle symbolize workers and farmers and the brush intellectuals. The triumvirate is based on the emblem of the Workers' Party of Korea. The monument reaches to a height of 50 meters to signify the 50th anniversary of the party.

The architectural style bears resemblance to concrete structures in the city, such as the Pyongyang Ice Rink or the Ryugyong Hotel.

Belt
The three fists are surrounded by a belt, symbolizing the "single-hearted unity of the leader, Party and people". The inscription on the outer belt reads: "Long live the leader and organizer of the victories of the people of Korea, the Workers' Party of Korea!" The diameter of the belt is 50 meters on the outside and 42 meters on the inside. The belt is made of 216 blocks. The 216 blocks and the 42-meter inner diameter symbolize the date 16 February 1942, the purported date of birth of Kim Jong-il. In reality, he was born on 16 February 1941 in the Soviet Union.

The circular foundation under the monument is 70 meters in diameter symbolizing the about 70-year history of the party from the days of the Down-With-Imperialism Union. On the inside of the belt are three reliefs covering the history of the party.

See also

 Juche Tower
 Arch of Triumph (Pyongyang)
 Party Foundation Day
 History of the Workers' Party of Korea
 Socialist realism
 Culture of North Korea
 Korean architecture

References

Works cited

 
 
  Running time: 7:38.

External links

 
 360-degree panorama
  
  

Monuments and memorials in North Korea
Buildings and structures in Pyongyang
1995 establishments in North Korea
Buildings and structures completed in 1995
History of the Workers' Party of Korea
20th-century architecture in North Korea